Meet Me in Bluesland is a 2015 album by American southern rock band The Kentucky Headhunters and blues musician Johnnie Johnson. Recorded in 2003 during the sessions for the Kentucky Headhunters' 2003 album Soul, it was not released until 2015, ten years after Johnson's death.

History
The Kentucky Headhunters had planned to include Johnson on their 2003 album Soul, but in the process of recording, the band created multiple songs with Johnson spontaneously. The recordings were not initially planned to be released, due to their nature. The album is the band's second collaboration with Johnson, the first being 1993's That'll Work. Included on the album are a re-recording of "Stumblin'" from that album, along with a cover of Chuck Berry's "Little Queenie".

Critical reception
Grant Britt of No Depression reviewed the album positively, comparing the sound favorably to that of Chuck Berry while praising Doug Phelps's lead vocals.

Track listing
All tracks written by The Kentucky Headhunters (Anthony Kenney, Greg Martin, Doug Phelps, Fred Young, Richard Young) and Johnnie Johnson except as noted.

"Stumblin'" (Johnson, Kenney, Martin, Mark S. Orr, F. Young, R. Young) - 3:08
"Walking with the Wolf" - 3:28
"Little Queenie" (Chuck Berry) - 3:31
"She's Got to Have It" - 3:18
"Party in Heaven" (Kenney, Martin, Phelps, F. Young, R. Young) - 3:28
"Meet Me in Bluesland" - 5:44
"King Rooster" - 4:31
"Shufflin' Back to Memphis" - 4:50
"Fast Train" - 3:34
instrumental
"Sometime" - 3:55
"Superman Blues" - 4:02

Personnel
 Doug Phelps - rhythm guitar, lead vocals (1, 5, 7, 8, 10)
 Johnnie Johnson - piano, lead vocals (track 4)
 Anthony Kenney - bass guitar, backing vocals
 Greg Martin - lead guitar, backing vocals
 Fred Young - drums, backing vocals
 Richard Young - rhythm guitar, lead vocals (2, 3, 6, 11)

References

2015 albums
The Kentucky Headhunters albums
Johnnie Johnson (musician) albums
Alligator Records albums
Collaborative albums